Minuscule 38 (in the Gregory-Aland numbering), δ 355 (Von Soden). It is a Greek minuscule manuscript of the New Testament, written on vellum. Palaeographically it has been assigned to the 12th century. Formerly it was labelled by 38e, 19a, 377p.
The manuscript is lacunose. It has marginalia.

Description 

The codex contains text of the four Gospels, Acts and epistles on 300 parchment leaves, with some lacunae (Matthew 14:15-15:30; 20:14-21:37; Mark 12:3-13:4). The text is written 1 column per page, 30 lines per page, size .

The text of the Gospels is also divided according to the smaller Ammonian Sections (in Mark 241, 16:20), but without references to the Eusebian Canons.

It contains pictures. It has notes on the margin in Greek.

Text 

The Greek text of the codex is a representative of the Byzantine text-type. Kurt Aland did not place it in any Category. According to the Claremont Profile Method it represents textual family Kx in Luke 1, Luke 10, and Luke 20.

History 

The manuscript was dated by Gregory to the 13th century. Currently it has been assigned by the INTF to the 12th century.

The manuscript was written on the order of Michael VIII Palaiologos (1260-1282), and was presented to the king of France Louis IX in 1269 or 1270. Wettstein rightly judged that it was used by Robert Estienne in his Editio Regia as θ'. The text of the manuscript was collated by Wettstein.

It was examined and described by Paulin Martin.

It was added to the list of the New Testament manuscripts by Wettstein. C. R. Gregory saw the manuscript in 1885.

It is currently housed at the Bibliothèque nationale de France (Coislin Gr. 200) at Paris.

See also 

 List of New Testament minuscules
 Biblical manuscripts
 Textual criticism

References

Further reading 

 Berger de Xivrey, "Notice d'un ms grec du XIIIe siècle conservé à la bibliothèque impériale ..." 10 (Paris, 1863).

Greek New Testament minuscules
12th-century biblical manuscripts
Fonds Coislin